Flexiseps is a genus of skinks. They are all endemic to Madagascar. Some taxonomic authorities place the group in the genus Amphiglossus.

Species
The following 15 species, listed alphabetically by specific name, are recognized as being valid:
Flexiseps alluaudi (Brygoo, 1981)
Flexiseps andranovahensis (Angel, 1933) – Andranovaho skink
Flexiseps ardouini (Mocquard, 1897) – yellow skink
Flexiseps crenni (Mocquard, 1906)
Flexiseps decaryi (Angel, 1930) – rock skink
Flexiseps elongatus (Angel, 1933) 
Flexiseps johannae (Günther, 1880) – Johanna's skink
Flexiseps mandokava Raxworthy & Nussbaum, 1993 
Flexiseps melanurus (Günther, 1877) – spotted skink
Flexiseps meva Miralles, Raselimanana, Rakotomalala, Vences, & Vieites, 2011 
Flexiseps ornaticeps (Boulenger, 1896) – grey skink
Flexiseps stylus Andreone & Greer, 2002 
Flexiseps tanysoma Andreone & Greer, 2002 
Flexiseps tsaratananensis (Brygoo, 1981) – Tsaratanana skink
Flexiseps valhallae (Boulenger, 1909)

Nota bene: A binomial authority in parentheses indicates that the species was originally described in a genus other than Flexiseps.

References

Lizard genera
Flexiseps